The  was a commuter electric multiple unit (EMU) train type operated by the private railway operator Tokyu Corporation in Japan from 1 May 1986 until 10 February 2015. They were all rebuilt from 7200 series trains dating from 1967 to 1972.

Design
Two three-car sets were formed in 1986, followed by a third set in 1990.

Operations
These trains initially operated on the Mekama Line and Ōimachi Line. They were later concentrated on the Ikegami Line and used with the 7200 series. The 7600 series trains were used on the Tamagawa Line and Ikegami Line. A special farewell event for the 7600 series was held on 7 February 2015, and they were finally withdrawn on 10 February the same year. No 7600 series cars have been preserved.

Formations
As of 1 April 2014, two three-car sets were in service, formed as shown below, with two motored ("M") cars and one non-powered trailer ("T") car, and car 1 at the Gotanda/Tamagawa end.

Car 2 had two lozenge-type pantographs.

Livery variations
From November 2014, set 7601 was returned to service after overhaul in the plain unpainted stainless steel livery formerly carried by the 7200 series trains.

References

Electric multiple units of Japan
7600 series
Train-related introductions in 1986
1500 V DC multiple units of Japan